is a component of the Japanese game show The Tunnels' Thanks to Everyone. Video clips from the show proliferated on video-sharing websites and the concept was eventually adopted by several other countries. It became popularly known to non-Japanese speakers and YouTube fans as simply Human Tetris or Hole in the Wall, named for its involvement of the physical body and a supposed close resemblance to the rules of the video game Tetris.

Game rules
The rules of the game are the same, and how points are awarded varies from country to country.

 Contestants wearing helmets and elbow and knee pads and a silver (or gold in some countries) spandex unitard stand on the "Play Area". They have to make use of their wits in seconds to assume the position that will allow them to fit through the opening(s). Later episodes involve the use of more complicated shapes, such as words, gymnastic positions, shapes from popular culture, and even above-ground-level shapes. Contestants usually have to twist and bend their bodies with agility and dexterity to fit through the hole in the wall.
 Contestants play in teams and only win points if they are able to fit though the wall. Points are awarded if the contestant(s) in the round are able to successfully cross the Styrofoam wall completely, except in the following situations :
 No points are awarded if any of the contestants fall into the water due to any reason, even if they successfully pass through the wall. (There have been instances where the wall is cleared but contestants find themselves trapped over the water)
 No points are awarded if the contestants crash through the styrofoam wall causing it to break apart.

The first component of the game involves a solo contestant, while later components involve groups of two people or more.

International versions
The production rights to the show outside Japan is owned by Fremantle and the program has been produced in over 45 countries.

References

Japanese game shows
Television series by Fremantle (company)